Paul Meyer (born 15 August 1961) is a Zimbabwean sports shooter. He competed in the mixed trap event at the 1980 Summer Olympics.

References

External links
 

1961 births
Living people
Zimbabwean male sport shooters
Olympic shooters of Zimbabwe
Shooters at the 1980 Summer Olympics
Place of birth missing (living people)